Isaac Newton Comstock (January 25, 1808 in Saratoga County, New York – March 24, 1883) was an American politician from New York.

Life
He lived at Albany, New York, and was married to Elizabeth (or Betsey) Hussey (d. 1842).

He was one of the first three Inspectors of State Prisons elected on the Whig ticket in 1847 under the New York State Constitution of 1846, and drew the two-year term, being in office from 1848 to 1849. Afterwards he became Agent (financial officer), and also Warden of Clinton State Prison.

In March 1864, he entered the Commissary department of the Union Army with the rank of captain. On July 10, 1865, he was brevetted major of volunteers, and honorably mustered out on the next day.

Stage actress Nanette Comstock (1866–1942) was his niece.

References
The New York Civil List compiled by Franklin Benjamin Hough (page 45; Weed, Parsons and Co., 1858)
The United States Service Magazine (published by Charles B. Richardson, 1864; pages 431f)
U.S. Army Register (published by the U.S. Adjutant General's office, 1865; page 70)
Documents of the Assembly of the State of New York (1852; page 97)
The Annals of Albany by Joel Munsell (1859; page 331)
A History and Genealogy of the Comstock Family in America by John Adams Comstock (Commonwealth Press, 1949) [gives 1883 as death year]
Historical Register and Dictionary of the United States Army, from its organization, September 29, 1789, to March 2, 1903 by Francis Bernard Heitman (Genealogical Publishing Co., 1994) [gives 1886 as death year]

1808 births
1883 deaths
Politicians from Albany, New York
People from Saratoga County, New York
People of New York (state) in the American Civil War
New York State Prison Inspectors
Union Army officers
New York (state) Whigs
19th-century American politicians
Military personnel from Albany, New York